Paw Paw Township is a township in Elk County, Kansas, USA.  As of the 2000 census, its population was 116.

Geography
According to the USGS, it contains two cemeteries: Cresco and Pleasant View.

References
 USGS Geographic Names Information System (GNIS)

External links
 US-Counties.com

Townships in Elk County, Kansas
Townships in Kansas